Mullinhassig Wood is a Coillte-owned property, straddling the townlands of Aghavrin and Shanavagha,  north-west of Coachford village in County Cork, Ireland. It is accessible to the public, and frequented by locals and visitors alike.

Mullinhassig, is an anglicised place name of the Irish Muileann an Easaigh, meaning 'Mill of the Waterfall'. Lewis describes the glen of Mullinassig as having "beautiful and romantic scenery", its sides "adorned with wood, and at its head a little mill, below which the river forms a cascade and a little lower falls into a beautiful lake". The "romantic glen of Mullinassig" is also said to derive its name from a mill. Milner (1975) describes the "lovely waterfall of Mullinhassig", interpreting Muileann Easaigh as "the mill of the waterfall".  This particular premises was a fulling mill, which in later times was converted to a creamery, and a private residence now occupies the site.

The 1842 surveyed OS map depicts a cataract, and correctly gives the name as Poulanassig. This is Poulanassig Waterfall, generally regarded as Mullinhassig Waterfall and incorrectly named on informational signage. "Mullinhassig Waterfall" actually adjoins the mill site to the north-west of Poulanassig, and is correctly depicted on the 1842 surveyed OS map. The 1901 surveyed OS map also correctly names Poulanassig waterfall, and refers to the glen as Mullinhassig.

Three waterfalls have existed in this area, and two remain (Mullinhassig & Poulanassig waterfalls).  The Ordnance Survey (OS) name book (c. 1840) describes a small pond of water as 2 chains north of Poulanassig in the River Clashgorrave, and at the mouth of which is (Mullinhassig) waterfall of about 18 feet. This pond was known as "Good's pond", as depicted on the 1842 surveyed OS map, and so named after the landowner who ran an irrigation stream from the pond to his land. The OS name book also describes a pond of water in the River Clashagorrave c. 10 chains south of Poulanassig, and, at its mouth, 12 foot "Poulachourane Waterfall". This pond was "Bowing's (Bowen's) Pond", constructed by Bowen of Oakgrove, with an irrigation stream leading from it to his land. This pond no longer exists and is now a wet, overgrown area, with a small stream running through. Neither does Poulachourane Waterfall exist, also depicted on the 1842 surveyed OS map.

The Irish Tourist Association survey of 1944 advises that (Poulanassig) waterfall is a thirty foot cascade of the Glashnagarriff river, and a "popular venue with visitors", and gives some local folklore. A mermaid in the form of a salmon is said to reside in the waterfall pool, who, if approached quietly in late evening, can be seen combing her hair on a stone "stool" to the left of the waterfall. If a stranger is sensed, she dives to the bottom of the pool. Near the brink of the waterfall is a boulder, said to be the mermaid's "table". Another version has the mermaid enticing unwary anglers to the bottom of the pool, where they spend the rest of their existence releasing fish from the hooks of fellow anglers. This is said to be the reason why no fish are caught there, though the pool is "full of salmon".

At the eastern end of Mullinhassig Wood is Aghavrin Clapper Bridge.

See also
Aghavrin (townland)
Aghavrin House
Aghavrin Cottage
Aghavrin Clapper Bridge
Aghavrin Mass Rock
Crooke's Castle, Aghavrin
St Olan's, Aghavrin

References

External links
 acrheritage.info

Waterfalls of the Republic of Ireland
Landforms of County Cork